Muhammad Sajid Mehmood Sethi (born 19 May 1968) is a Pakistani jurist who has been Justice of the Lahore High Court since 8 June 2015.

Early life and education
Sethi born in Lahore. He got his education at the University of the Punjab and Downing College, Cambridge. He joined private practice as a founding partner of Afridi, Shah & Minallah, and was involved in the Lawyers' Movement of 2007 seeking restoration of the judiciary.

References

1968 births
Living people
Judges of the Lahore High Court
Pakistani judges
Alumni of Downing College, Cambridge
University of the Punjab alumni